The men's team pursuit race of the 2013–14 ISU Speed Skating World Cup 1, arranged in the Olympic Oval, in Calgary, Alberta, Canada, was held on 9 November 2013.

The Dutch team won on a new world record, while the American team came second, and the South Korean team came third.

Results
The race took place on Saturday, 9 November, in the morning session, scheduled at 13:17.

References

Men team pursuit
1